Frank Phillips may refer to:

 Frank Phillips (cricketer) (1873–1955), English cricketer
 Frank Phillips (Missouri politician) (1862–1926), American politician
 Frank Phillips (oil industrialist) (1873–1950), founded Phillips Petroleum in Bartlesville, Oklahoma
 Frank Phillips (golfer), Australian professional golfer
 Frank Phillips (newsreader) (1901–1980), British newsreader (BBC), see The Dam Busters (film)
 Frank V. Phillips (1912–1994), American cinematographer in Bedknobs and Broomsticks